Leslie House in Leslie, Fife was the largest and earliest Restoration house in Fife, Scotland.  The building was gutted in a 2009 fire. Several of the buildings are listed. Sir Robert Spencer Nairn acquired the house in 1919 and in 1952, donated it to the Church of Scotland.

History
It was built for the John Leslie, the Duke of Rothes between 1667 and 1674 and this became the seat of the Rothes family. The house which was dubbed Villa De Rothes was the centre of life in the village and once rivalled Holyrood Palace for both size and glamour. A 1667 extension was by a design of William Bruce. When a fire destroyed the building in 1763, the north, east and south wings were demolished. Only the west wing was retained and this was reconstructed between 1745 and 1747. From 1904 to 1919, Leslie House was the home of Noëlle, Countess of Rothes, a noted philanthropist who became famous as a heroine of the Titanic disaster in 1912. During World War I Lady Rothes converted a wing of Leslie House into a hospital for wounded soldiers invalided from the Front. Leslie House was again severely damaged by fire in February 2009. Restoration of the building, as well as plans to create 17 luxury homes from the renovated property, is proposed but the building is currently on the Buildings at Risk Register.

Architecture and fittings

The architecture and fittings were described by Leighton in 1840:  "It originally formed a quadrangle, enclosing in the centre an extensive court-yard, but three of the sides were burnt down in December 1763. The fourth side was repaired, and forms the present house. The picture gallery in this part of the building, which is hung with portraits of connections of the family, is three feet longer than the gallery at Holyroodhouse."

Among the several pictures at Leslie House in the mid 19th century mentioned by Leighton, "were those of the fifth Earl and his Countess, by Jamieson, the Duke and Duchess of Rothes, the celebrated Duke of Lauderdale and his Duchess, the Princess of Modena; General John, Earl of Rothes, by Sir Joshua Reynolds; Archbishop Tillotson; and a portrait of Rembrandt by himself." A portrait of the Princess of Modena and a large collection of family portraits are also mentioned.

The house featured several tapestries including, the story of Leander; the history of the children of Israel's journey through the wilderness; and the anointing of Saul. In the mid 19th century, the relics preserved in the house included the dagger with its sheath used by Norman Leslie, master of Rothes, at the murder of Cardinal Bethune; and the sword of State carried by the Duke of Rothes at the coronation of Charles II at Scone.

Grounds

Blackwood (1836) remarked that, "The plantations of Leslie House are remarkably fine. The species that thrive best seem to be ash, elm, common beech, oak, and the silver-fir. The larch does not thrive so well... The beech avenue at Leslie House is well worthy of attention; the trees are about 200 years old, several of them measuring 16 feet 8 inches, at 4 feet from the ground."

Notes

References

Bibliography 

 
 

 

Houses completed in 1674
Country houses in Fife
Glenrothes
1674 establishments in Scotland